Rafael may refer to:

 Rafael (given name) or Raphael, a name of Hebrew origin
 Rafael, California
 Rafael Advanced Defense Systems, Israeli manufacturer of weapons and military technology
 Hurricane Rafael, a 2012 hurricane

Fiction 

 Rafael (TV series), a Mexican telenovela
 Rafaël (film), a 2018 Dutch film

People 
 Rafael (footballer, born 1978) (Rafael Pires Vieira), Brazilian football striker
 Rafael (footballer, born 1979) (Rafael da Silva Santos), Brazilian football defender
 Rafael (footballer, born 1980) (Rafael Pereira da Silva), Brazilian football right-back
 Rafael (footballer, born March 1982) (Rafael de Andrade Bittencourt Pinheiro), Brazilian football goalkeeper
 Rafael (footballer, born August 1982) (Rafael dos Santos Silva), Brazilian football striker
 Rafael (footballer, born 1984) (Alberto Rafael da Silva), Brazilian football goalkeeper
 Rafael (footballer, born 1986) (Rafael Diego de Souza), Brazilian football centre-back
 Rafael (footballer, born 1987) (Rafael da Silva Gomes), Brazilian footballer
 Rafael (footballer, born 1989) (Rafael Pires Monteiro), Brazilian football goalkeeper
 Rafael (footballer, born 1990) (Rafael Pereira da Silva), Brazilian football right-back for Botafogo
 Rafael (footballer, born 2002) (Rafael Luiz Santos da Costa), Brazilian football defender
 Alex Rafael (born 1988), Brazilian footballer

See also 
 Raphael (disambiguation)
 Dassault Rafale
 San Rafael (disambiguation)
 Raffaele